Atazanavir/cobicistat, sold under the brand name Evotaz, is a fixed-dose combination antiretroviral medication used to treat and prevent HIV/AIDS. It contains atazanavir and cobicistat. Atazanavir is an HIV protease inhibitor and cobicistat is an inhibitor of cytochrome P450 (CYP) enzymes of the CYP3A family.

Atazanavir/cobicistat was approved by the Food and Drug Administration (FDA) for medical use in United States in January 2015. It was approved for medical use in the European Union in July 2015.

Medical uses 
Atazanavir/cobicistat is indicated for use in combination with other antiretroviral agents for the treatment of HIV‑1 infection in people weighing at least .

References

External links
 

Antiretroviral drugs
Bristol Myers Squibb
CYP3A4 inhibitors
Fixed dose combination (antiretroviral)